Elks Athletic Club, also known as YWCA, in Louisville, Kentucky, is an eight-story building that was built in 1924.  It was designed by Joseph & Joseph in Classical Revival style.

It was sold and adapted into use as a hotel four years after it was built.  It served as a hotel until 1963, then became a YWCA.

It was listed on the National Register of Historic Places in 1979.

References

Clubhouses on the National Register of Historic Places in Kentucky
Neoclassical architecture in Kentucky
Cultural infrastructure completed in 1924
Elks buildings
National Register of Historic Places in Louisville, Kentucky
1924 establishments in Kentucky
YWCA buildings
Gyms in the United States